Paris Memories is a 2022 French drama film written and directed by Alice Winocour. The film stars Virginie Efira as Mia, a woman who is struggling with the lingering mental health effects of having survived a terrorist attack in Paris months earlier.

The film's cast also includes Benoît Magimel, Grégoire Colin, Maya Sansa, Amadou Mbow, Nastya Golubeva, Anne-Lise Heimburger, Sofia Lesaffre and Clarisse Makundul.

The film premiered in the Directors' Fortnight program of the 2022 Cannes Film Festival. It is had its North American premiere at the 2022 Toronto International Film Festival. It was released theatrically in France on 7 September 2022 by Pathé.

References

External links
 

2022 films
2022 drama films
2020s French films
2020s French-language films
Films about terrorism
Films directed by Alice Winocour
Films set in Paris
France 3 Cinéma films
French drama films
November 2015 Paris attacks
Pathé films